The Yamaha YZF-R15 is a single-cylinder sport bike made by Yamaha Motor Company in 2008.[1] In September 2011, the second iteration, called v2 .0, was released in India,[2] and in April 2014 it was released in Indonesia.[3] In January 2017, the bike’s third iteration, v3.0, was launched in Indonesia.[4]

Specifications 
The engine for the first and second iteration (v2.0) was a 149.8 cc single cylinder four-stroke engine with four valves and a single overhead camshaft. The radiator is placed in the front of the engine with a fan behind it. The coolant reserve is on the left side up and behind the radiator. The transmission is a return type six-speed with a constant mesh wet multi-plate clutch.

For the first and second iteration, the bike had a  single disc with dual piston calipers in the front and a 220 mm single disc single piston caliper at the rear, both the brake systems being made by Nissin of Japan. The front suspension was a twin telescopic fork and the rear is a linked type single shock suspension. The bike has dual headlights like the other bikes of the YZF-R series.

For the 2017 update, the bike has a newer 155.1 cc engine. The front disc is larger than the previous iteration, with a measured . The front suspension is now an inverted twin telescopic fork. This iteration also features assist and slipper clutch.

v2.0 

The YZF-R15 v2.0 had undergone changes as compared to the previous version in the cases of the engine control unit (ECU), swingarm, drivetrain unit, split-seat design, higher seat height, LED tail light, wider tires, larger gear ratio (15/47), longer wheelbase, rear mudguard, and redesigned middle and tail section. The engine performance was largely similar, still having a six-speed transmission and a linked type single shock suspension added on the back.

In India, another variation of the YZF-R15 v2.0 was also introduced, named YZF-R15S. This model is largely similar to standard YZF-R15 v2.0 except for a flatter single seat, different tail lamp and rear mudguard.

An unfaired, or streetfighter/naked bike, variation of the YZF-R15 v2.0, called the M-Slaz (also called Xabre in Indonesia; TFX150 in the Philippines and Vietnam), is made in Thailand, Indonesia, and Vietnam.

v3.0 

The v3.0 has undergone changes as compared to the previous version in the cases of the updated bodywork and engine, now features VVA technology, assist and slipper clutch, hazard lamp, inverted front suspension fork, all-LED lighting system, full LCD panelmeter with shift indicator and wider tyres.

A streetfighter variation of the YZF-R15 v3.0, called the MT-15, was launched in Thailand on 6 October 2018, Indonesia on 18 January 2019, Vietnam on 7 March 2019 and India on 15 March 2019. The Indian version of the MT-15 uses a conventional telescopic fork instead of inverted type with the rest of the motorcycle being unchanged.

The retro-styled naked variation of the YZF-R15 v3.0, called the XSR155, was launched in Thailand on 16 August 2019.

The YZF-R15S based on the v3.0 model was launched on 17 November 2021.

v4.0 

The YZF-R15 v4.0 was introduced in India on 21 September 2021. The flagship variant called YZF-R15M is also available.

The Yamaha R15 V4 sits on the Deltabox frame, a design that is based on technologies garnered from the YZR500 GP competition machines. The frame adopts a box-shaped cross-section that enables a larger cross-section surface area, lighter weight and high rigidity.

References

External links 

  (India)

YZF-R15
Sport bikes
Motorcycles introduced in 2008